Joseph Louis Alphonse Charles Langlois (August 24, 1894 – August 31, 1965) was a Canadian hockey forward who played four seasons in the National Hockey League for the Hamilton Tigers, New York Americans, Pittsburgh Pirates and Montreal Canadiens. He also spent several years playing in various minor leagues, and retired in 1932. He was born in Lotbinière, Quebec.

Career statistics

Regular season and playoffs

External links

1894 births
1965 deaths
Canadian ice hockey forwards
Hamilton Tigers (ice hockey) players
Ice hockey people from Quebec
Montreal Canadiens players
New York Americans players
People from Chaudière-Appalaches
Pittsburgh Pirates (NHL) players